Opsiphanes is a genus of butterflies of the family Nymphalidae found from Mexico to South America.

Species
Listed alphabetically:
 Opsiphanes blythekitzmillerae Austin & A. Warren, 2007 – Minerva owl butterfly
 Opsiphanes bogotanus Distant, 1875
 Opsiphanes boisduvallii Doubleday, [1849]
 Opsiphanes camena Staudinger, [1886]
 Opsiphanes cassiae (Linnaeus, 1758)
 Opsiphanes cassina C. & R. Felder, 1862 – split-banded owlet
 Opsiphanes invirae (Hübner, [1808])
 Opsiphanes mutatus Stichel, 1902
 Opsiphanes quiteria (Stoll, [1780])
 Opsiphanes sallei Doubleday, [1849]
 Opsiphanes tamarindi C. & R. Felder, 1861
 Opsiphanes zelotes Hewitson, 1873

References

Morphinae
Nymphalidae of South America
Nymphalidae genera
Taxa named by Edward Doubleday